Children's Songs is an album by Jazz pianist Chick Corea, released in 1984.

Children's Songs mainly consists of short songs with simple themes. There is little development in the pieces, which capture a variety of melodies and moods. Corea began writing the first song in 1971.

In the preface of the annotated version Corea stated that he aimed "to convey simplicity as beauty, as represented in the Spirit of a child".

There are stylistic and structural parallels to the cycle Mikrokosmos, by Béla Bartók, including: 
 use of the pentatonic scales
 employment of unusual time signatures and cross-rhythms
 expressing a complex variety of atmosphere in a relatively short time
 increasing difficulty and complexity through the sequence

Track listing 
"No.1"
"No.2"
"No.3"
"No.4"
"No.5"
"No.6"
"No.7"
"No.8"
"No.9"
"No.10"
"No.11"
"No.12"
"No.13"
"No.14"
"No.15"
"No.16 & 17"
"No.18"
"No.19"
"No.20"
"Addendum" - (for violin, cello and piano)

Personnel 
 Chick Corea – piano
 Fred Sherry – cello
 Ida Kavafian – violin

References 

1984 albums
Chick Corea albums
Albums produced by Manfred Eicher
ECM Records albums
Compositions for solo piano